Trams in Bogotá were first inaugurated on December 24, 1884 with the first tramway pulled by mules, covering the route from Plaza de Bolívar to San Diego, in Bogotá, Colombia. In 1892, a tramline linking Plaza de Bolívar and Estación de la Sabana started operating. The original trams ran over wooden rails but since such tramways easily derailed, steel rails imported from England were later installed. In 1894, a tramcar ran on the  Estación de la Sabana to Chapinero line every twenty minutes.

In 1910, the system was electrified. The electric system was expanded and operated four lines.

The riots of April 1948, known as Bogotazo, caused the destruction of several tram vehicles. Bogotá's tramway provided services up to 1951 when all trams were replaced by trolleybuses on June 30, 1951.

Aerial tramway

The aerial tramway or cable car to Monserrate mountain began its construction on August 13, 1953 and was inaugurated on September 27, 1955; in a bicable modality with two cabins that transport 40 passengers each. It was built in 1955, and has two cabins each for 40 passengers. The  journey is traveled in 7 minutes, traveling over the downtown of the city. At the terminus on Monserrate mountain, there is a church, a restaurant and other smaller tourist attractions.

Funicular

The Funicular to Monserrate  is a tramway used for going from the city level ( above sea level) to the top of the Hill of Monserrate (3152 m). The  gauge funicular transports daily the inhabitants of the capital and tourists; it was finished in 1928 and inaugurated officially on August 18, 1929.

In December 2003, the funicular initiated a new phase with a more modern design in its cars, that now open their doors to the sky with a crystal ceiling, so that nobody can lose a single detail of the forests that surround the city, the beautiful panoramic view and beautiful sunsets. 
In its trip of only 4 minutes, the cable car rises with its big windows on its sides, offering a great view of the hill that makes contrast with the beautiful panoramic of the city. The dense vegetation of the high trees tops leave us a sensation of direct bonding between earth and sky.

Proposed modern tram to airport

63 km airport tram under study.  Vossloh, Torres Cámara and Conconcreto, which envisages that the 2bn pesos scheme could be funded through an 82:18 public-private partnership.  Route: Sabana Facatativá to Bosa via El Dorado International Airport.

See also
 Bogotá Metro proposal
 Bogotá Savannah Railway
 RegioTram
 Trams in Panama

References

External links
 The Tramways of Bogota – It presents 22 photographs of the tramway.
 The Funicular up Monserrate in Bogotá – Photographs of the Aerial tramway and Funicular
 Data about the funicular
 Time line - Public transport service in Bogotá  - 22 pages, photographs and videos.

Tram transport in Colombia
Transport in Bogotá
Metre gauge railways in Colombia
Bogota